Shakya is an ancient Indo-Aryan tribe to which the Buddha belonged.

Shakya may also refer to:

Shakya Chogden (1428–1507), Tibetan Buddhist scholar
Newar caste system, a community in Nepal and North Indiaπ

See also 
 Sakya